The United States Constitution was first printed by Dunlap & Claypoole in 1787, during the Constitutional Convention. From the original printing, 13 original copies are known to exist.

Dunlap & Claypoole 

The Constitutional Convention's printers, Dunlap & Claypoole, printed the drafts and final copies of the United States Constitution. John Dunlap and David C. Claypoole had printed for Congress since 1775, including the first copies of the Declaration of Independence and Articles of Confederation, and were designated Congress's official printer in 1778. During the 1787 Constitutional Convention, Dunlap & Claypoole printed 820 draft copies and 500 final copies at a total cost of $420. 

John Dunlap received the first draft of the Constitution from the Committee of Detail for printing as a seven-page broadside on August 4, 1787, and was turned around in two days for the Convention's members. Copies of this first draft exist in the separately collected papers of the Convention, James Madison, and David Brearley.

In early September, the Constitution was referred to the Committee of "Stile and arrangements" for revisions, with new copies of this second draft printed on September 12 for the convention's members. The Convention read the amended report the next day. Extant copies of this four-folio and penultimate draft of the Constitution rest in the papers of Madison and Brearley, as well as those of George Washington (Library of Congress), each with markings made over the next three days.

Three days following the second draft's printing, the Convention, with its business concluded, ordered a printing of 500 copies of the third and final draft on September 15, to be dated September 17, 1787, when the Convention's proceedings and its engrossed Constitution were to be signed. Apart from interlineations, the printed and engrossed versions are identical. The Constitutional Congress sent the Convention's report for state ratification on September 28. The Congress's records indicate orders of 200 additional copies in close proximity to their resolution.

In the final Constitution's printing, Dunlap & Claypoole produced 500 copies of a six-page broadside with Caslon small-pica type. Its sole typographical error mistakenly spelled out a number in Article Five but was corrected in subsequent reprints.

Extant final copies 

There are 13 extant original copies of the Constitution in known existence, two of which are owned privately. The final printings were rarely auctioned in the 200 years since their printing.

See also 
 Physical history of the United States Declaration of Independence
 ConstitutionDAO
 List of most expensive books and manuscripts

References

Bibliography 

 

 

 

 

 

Drafting of the United States Constitution
1787 in the United States